The Dutch Eredivisie in the 1998–99 season was contested by 18 teams. Feyenoord won the championship.

League standings

Results

Promotion/relegation play-offs
In the promotion/relegation competition, eight entrants (six from the Eerste Divisie and two from this league) entered in two groups. The group winners were promoted to (or remained in) the Eredivisie.

See also
 1998–99 Eerste Divisie
 1998–99 KNVB Cup

References

External links
 Eredivisie official website - info on all seasons 
 RSSSF

Eredivisie seasons
Netherlands
1998–99 in Dutch football